Abby Blackman (born 15 June 1984) is a Trinidad and Tobago female volleyball player. She was part of the Trinidad and Tobago women's national volleyball team.

She participated at the 2011 Women's Pan-American Volleyball Cup.

References

External links
 
 Abby Blackman at Volleybox
 

1984 births
Living people
Trinidad and Tobago women's volleyball players
Place of birth missing (living people)
Beach volleyball players at the 2018 Commonwealth Games
Commonwealth Games competitors for Trinidad and Tobago